Győr-Moson-Sopron is an administrative county (comitatus or vármegye) in north-western Hungary, on the border with Slovakia (Bratislava Region, Nitra Region and Trnava Region) and Austria (Burgenland). It shares borders with the Hungarian counties Komárom-Esztergom, Veszprém and Vas. The capital of Győr-Moson-Sopron county is Győr. The county is a part of the Centrope Project.

History
Győr-Sopron county was created in 1950 from two counties: Győr-Moson and Sopron. Though formed as a result of the general Communist administrative reform of that year, it is the long-term result of the impact of earlier border changes on Hungary's western counties. In 1921 the counties of Moson and Sopron were each divided in two, with their western districts together forming the northern half of the Austrian province of Burgenland. Between 1921 and 1945, Győr and Moson became part of the "provisionally and administratively unified counties of Győr-Moson-Pozsony", renamed after 1945 as simply Győr-Moson. In 1947 the borders of this county were modified when Hungary lost three villages in the far north of Győr-Moson to Czechoslovakia as a consequence of the Hungarian peace treaty signed in that year. Though Győr is the capital, there is a strong rivalry between it and Sopron, historically an important cultural centre on its own right. The county also contains Hegyeshalom, Hungary's busiest international land border crossing point. In 1990, it was officially renamed to Győr-Moson-Sopron county.

Geography

Demographics

Győr-Moson-Sopron is the only county in Hungary whose population has been increasing according to the Központi Statisztikai Hivatal (KSH). The population density was 108/km².

Ethnicity
Besides the Hungarian majority, the main minorities are the Germans (approx. 5,000), Roma (3,500), Croats (3,000) and Slovaks (1,500).

Ethnic composition according to the KSH

Religion

Religious adherence in the county according to 2011 census:

Regional structure

Politics

County Assembly

The Győr-Moson-Sopron County Council, elected at the 2014 local government elections, is made up of 21 counselors, with the following party composition:

Presidents of the County Assembly

Members of the National Assembly
The following members elected of the National Assembly during the 2022 parliamentary election:

Municipalities 
Győr-Moson-Sopron County has 2 urban counties, 10 towns, 4 large villages and 167 villages.

Cities with county rights
(ordered by population, as of 2011 census)
Győr (129,527) – county seat
Sopron (60,548)

Towns

 Mosonmagyaróvár (32,004)
 Csorna (10,558)
 Kapuvár (10,495)
 Jánossomorja (5,921)
 Tét (3,954)
 Fertőszentmiklós (3,818)
 Pannonhalma (3,691)
 Fertőd (3,261)
 Lébény (3,156)
 Beled (2,633)

Villages

 Abda
 Acsalag
 Agyagosszergény
 Ágfalva
 Árpás
 Ásványráró
 Babót
 Bágyogszovát
 Bakonygyirót
 Bakonypéterd
 Bakonyszentlászló
 Barbacs
 Bezenye
 Bezi
 Bodonhely
 Bogyoszló
 Börcs
 Bőny
 Bősárkány 
 Cakóháza
 Cirák
 Csáfordjánosfa
 Csapod
 Csér
 Csikvánd
 Darnózseli
 Dénesfa
 Dör
 Dunakiliti
 Dunaremete
 Dunaszeg
 Dunaszentpál
 Dunasziget
 Ebergőc
 Edve
 Egyed
 Egyházasfalu
 Enese
 Écs
 Farád
 Fehértó
 Feketeerdő
 Felpéc
 Fenyőfő
 Fertőboz
 Fertőendréd
 Fertőhomok
 Fertőrákos
 Fertőszéplak
 Gönyű
 Gyalóka
 Gyarmat
 Gyóró
 Gyömöre
 Győrasszonyfa
 Győrság
 Győrladamér
 Győrszemere
 Győrsövényház
 Győrzámoly
 Győrújbarát
 Győrújfalu
 Halászi
 Harka
 Hegyeshalom 
 Hegykő
 Hédervár
 Hidegség
 Himod
 Hövej
 Ikrény
 Iván
 Jobaháza
 Kajárpéc
 Károlyháza
 Kimle
 Kisbabot
 Kisbajcs
 Kisbodak
 Kisfalud
 Koroncó
 Kóny
 Kópháza
 Kunsziget
 Lázi
 Levél
 Lipót
 Lövő
 Maglóca
 Magyarkeresztúr
 Máriakálnok
 Markotabödöge
 Mecsér
 Mérges
 Mezőörs
 Mihályi
 Mosonszentmiklós
 Mosonszolnok
 Mórichida
 Nagybajcs
 Nagycenk 
 Nagylózs
 Nagyszentjános
 Nemeskér
 Nyalka
 Nyúl
 Osli
 Öttevény
 Páli
 Pásztori
 Pázmándfalu
 Pereszteg
 Petőháza
 Pér
 Pinnye
 Potyond
 Pusztacsalád
 Püski
 Rajka
 Ravazd
 Rábacsanak
 Rábacsécsény
 Rábakecöl
 Rábapatona
 Rábapordány
 Rábasebes
 Rábaszentandrás
 Rábaszentmihály
 Rábaszentmiklós
 Rábatamási
 Rábcakapi
 Répceszemere
 Répcevis
 Rétalap
 Röjtökmuzsaj
 Románd
 Sarród
 Sikátor
 Sobor
 Sokorópátka
 Sopronhorpács
 Sopronkövesd
 Sopronköhida
 Sopronnémeti
 Szakony
 Szany 
 Szárföld
 Szerecseny
 Szil
 Szilsárkány
 Táp
 Tápszentmiklós
 Tarjánpuszta
 Tárnokréti
 Tényő
 Töltéstava
 Und
 Újkér
 Újrónafő
 Vadosfa
 Vág
 Vámosszabadi
 Várbalog
 Vásárosfalu
 Veszkény
 Veszprémvarsány
 Vének
 Vitnyéd
 Völcsej
 Zsebeháza
 Zsira

 municipalities are large villages.

Gallery

International relations 
Győr-Moson-Sopron County has a partnership relationship with:

References

External links
 Official site 
 Kisalföld (kisalfold.hu) – The county portal
Hungary at GeoHive

 
Counties of Hungary